The Journal of Biblical Literature (JBL) is one of three academic journals published by the Society of Biblical Literature (SBL). First published in 1881, JBL is the flagship journal of the field. JBL is published quarterly and includes scholarly articles, critical notes, and book reviews by members of the Society. JBL is available on line as well as in print.

JBL has a moving window of Open Access. Aside from the current issue, the past three years of JBL are freely available to the public in PDF form, after registering on the SBL website. Previous issues, back to 1881, are available in the JSTOR Arts and Sciences III collection."

History
The journal was originally published under the title Journal of the Society of Biblical Literature and Exegesis. The current name was adopted with volume 9 (1890).

At the fourth meeting, on 29 December 1881, the SBL council voted to print 500 copies of a journal, including the full text of papers read at the society's annual June meetings.

JBL was, at first, an annual serial, from 1882 to 1905 (though two serials appeared in each of 1886 and 1887). JBL became semiannual from 1906 to 1911, and has been quarterly since 1912 (with a hiatus in 1915 and exceptional years with only two serials).

In 1916, the SBL secretary passed on to the members a communication, from the Third Assistant Postmaster General of the United States, refusing to give the JBL the second-class rate discount for scholarly journals, "on the ground that it was not scientific."

"The Journal of the Society for Biblical Literature in the United States was published in Leipzig through World War I down to the Nazi period—yet for the most part this feature showed up only when it became a problem for delivery after Germany began to be devastated after 1916."

Samuel Sharpe, an English ordained minister and egyptologist was editor of a journal also called Journal of Biblical Literature, published from London prior to the establishment of SBL and its journal.

Editors
JBL editors:

Note: the title editor was introduced in 1938, the SBL secretary fulfilling the role in prior years.

See also
Review of Biblical Literature
SBL Forum

References

External links
Back Issues of JBL — open access to last three years of JBL, excepting current issue.
JSTOR all back issues from 1881. [subscription required]
Harold W. Attridge and James C. VanderKam (eds). Presidential Voices: The Society of Biblical Literature in the Twentieth Century. Society of Biblical Literature, 2006.

Other sources
AE Harvey, 'Learned Journals - New Testament Studies: Journal for the Study of the New Testament. Journal of Biblical Literature.', Times Literary Supplement 5426 (30 March 2007): 23-24.
Ernest W. Saunders, Searching the Scriptures: A History of the Society of Biblical Literature 1880–1980, (Chico: Scholars Press, 1982).

Quarterly journals
Publications established in 1881
Academic journals published by learned and professional societies
Biblical studies journals
1881 establishments in the United States